The 1993 Seattle Seahawks season was the franchise's 18th in the National Football League (NFL). Playing under head coach and general manager Tom Flores, the team finished with a 6–10 win–loss record in the AFC West and missed the playoffs for the fifth straight season. In the first round of the 1993 NFL Draft, Seattle selected quarterback Rick Mirer, who became their starter for the 1993 season.

At the end of the season, running back Chris Warren, defensive tackle Cortez Kennedy, and safety Eugene Robinson were selected to play for the AFC in the 1994 Pro Bowl, the NFL's honorary all-star game.

Offseason

NFL Draft

Personnel

Staff

Final roster

     Starters in bold.
 (*) Denotes players that were selected for the 1994 Pro Bowl.

Schedule

Preseason

Regular season

Bold indicates division opponents.

Standings

Game Summaries

Preseason

Week P1: vs. Indianapolis Colts

Week P2: at Minnesota Vikings

Week P3: vs. San Francisco 49ers

Week P4: at Houston Oilers

Regular season

Week 1: at San Diego Chargers

Seattle began the season with an 18–12 loss to the San Diego Chargers in a game that featured no offensive touchdowns. Joe Nash scored the game's first points with a 12-yard interception return for a touchdown, on a ball tipped into the air by Cortez Kennedy. Though the Seattle defense held the Chargers to no touchdowns, kicker John Carney had made six field goals to Seattle's one, as the Chargers led 18–10 in the fourth quarter. With 1:25 left in the game, Mirer completed a pass to Brian Blades to the Chargers' two-yard line, but a hit by linebacker Gary Plummer made Blades lose the ball. Seattle scored a safety as the Chargers ran out the clock to win 18–12. Sportswriter John Clayton noted that San Diego's game-plan was to run the football with halfback Marion Butts, and to run the ball to the left side, away from Kennedy. Clayton observed that the strategy worked against a defense he described as "tough", but mistakes by Seattle's linebackers allowed San Diego to earn "modest gains" on plays to keep drives moving. The first rookie quarterback to start a Seahawks season opener, Mirer finished the game with 154 yards and completed 20 of 27 pass attempts.

Week 2: vs. Los Angeles Raiders

In their home opener, Seattle lost to the Los Angeles Raiders, 13–17.

Week 3: at New England Patriots

Week 4: at Cincinnati Bengals

Week 5: vs. San Diego Chargers

Week 7: at Detroit Lions

Week 8: vs. New England Patriots

Week 9 at Denver Broncos

Week 10: at Houston Oilers

Week 11: vs. Cleveland Browns

As of the 2017 season, this is the second most-recent of only eight NFL games since 1940 where both teams scored a safety, with the only more recent one occurring the following season between the Cardinals and the Oilers.

Week 13: vs. Denver Broncos

Week 14: vs. Kansas City Chiefs

Week 15: at Los Angeles Raiders

Week 16: vs. Phoenix Cardinals

Week 17: vs. Pittsburgh Steelers

Week 18: at Kansas City Chiefs

References

External links
 Seahawks draft history at NFL.com
 1993 NFL season results at NFL.com

Seattle
Seattle Seahawks seasons
Seattle